The 2012–13 Chicago State Cougars men's basketball team represented Chicago State University during the 2012–13 NCAA Division I men's basketball season. The Cougars, led by third year head coach Tracy Dildy, played their home games at the Emil and Patricia Jones Convocation Center as member of the Great West Conference. They finished the season 11–22, 3–5 in Great West play to finish in a three way tie for third place. They were champions of the Great West tournament, held on their home floor, to earn an automatic bid into the 2013 CIT where they lost in the first round to Illinois–Chicago.

This was Chicago State's final season in the Great West. They joined the Western Athletic Conference in July 2013.

Roster

Schedule and results

|-
!colspan=9| Regular season

|-
!colspan=9| 2013 Great West Conference men's basketball tournament

|-
!colspan=9| 2013 CIT

References

Chicago State Cougars men's basketball seasons
Chicago State
Chicago State